Attorney General Conway may refer to:

D. Walter Conway (1898–1956),  Attorney General of South Dakota
George C. Conway (1900–1969), Attorney General of Connecticut
Jack Conway (politician) (born 1969), Attorney General of Kentucky
Joe Conway (Arizona lawyer) (1898–1945),  Attorney General of Arizona

See also
General Conway (disambiguation)